Tir Afjan (also Romanized as Tīr Afjān; also known as Tīramjān) is a village in Posht Par Rural District, Simakan District, Jahrom County, Fars Province, Iran. At the 2006 census, its population was 195, in 40 families.

References 

Populated places in Jahrom County